The 29th century BC was a century that lasted  from the year 2900 BC to 2801 BC.

Events

 BC: Beginning of the Early Dynastic Period I in Sumer.
 BC – 2600 BC: Votive statues from the Square Temple of Eshnunna (modern Tell Ashmar, Iraq) were made. One of them is now in the Oriental Institute of the University of Chicago. Excavated 1932–1933.
 – 2400 BC: Sumerian pictographs evolve into phonograms.
2900 BC – 2334 BC: Mesopotamian wars of the Early Dynastic period.
2900 BC-First Mariote Kingdom founded.
2890 BC: Egypt: Pharaoh Qa'a died. End of First Dynasty, start of Second Dynasty. Pharaoh Hotepsekhemwy started to rule.
2890 BC – Akkadian language names are recorded from about this time period.
2880 BC: Estimated germination of the Prometheus Tree, previously thought to be the world's oldest living organism until it was cut down in 1964 AD.
2879 BC: Hùng Vương Kinh Dương Vương established the Hồng Bàng dynasty in Vietnam (then known as Văn Lang). 
 BC: The 365-day calendar year was installed in ancient Egypt, with fixed lunar months of 30 days + 5 epagomenal days.
2863 BC: Egyptian 2nd Dynasty Prince Raneb born around this year in history.  
2860 BC: Saqqara Tomb A construction started. 
2852 BC: The beginning of the period of the Three Sovereigns and Five Emperors in China.
 BC: The Balearic cave goat became extinct around this time.
2832 BC: Estimated germination of the oldest living tree and organism on earth as of 2020 the Methuselah Tree, the second-oldest known organism. Sprouting in what would become Inyo County, California. 
2807 BC: Suggested date for an asteroid or comet impact occurring between Africa and Antarctica, around the time of a solar eclipse on May 10, based on an analysis of flood stories. Possibly causing the Burckle crater and Fenambosy Chevron.
Ur becomes one of the richest cities in Sumer

Architecture
29th century BC in architecture

References

 

 
-1
-71